Agaricus moelleri, also known as the inky mushroom, or dark scaled mushroom, is a large mushroom of the genus Agaricus. It appears occasionally in most kinds of woodland, during late summer, in northern temperate zones.

Taxonomy
For many years Agaricus moelleri was erroneously accredited with the binomial Agaricus placomyces by some British authors. The epithet placomyces  was in fact given to a North American species of Agaricus by Charles Horton Peck in 1878 (now known as Agaricus praeclaresquamosus A.E.Freeman 1979). The current binomial Agaricus moelleri was published in 1976 by the Ukrainian mycologist Solomon P. Wasser.

Description
The cap has a greyish-brown patch in the centre and cold grey-brown scaling on the surrounding off-white background. It is ovate when young, flattening later. The stem has a drooping ring, and stains yellow very easily when bruised, this colour then changes to brown over time. The stem flesh bruises yellow only faintly, and is more noticeable in the base. The gills are crowded, and free, as is typical for an Agaricus. They are pink on young specimens, but brown to black on older fruit bodies. The flesh is white and does not change colour on cutting. It is noted by some authors as smelling like ink, iodoform, sweat, or mouldy straw. The spores are 4–6 x 3–4 µm, and are elliptical. The odour resembles phenol.

A similar species occurring in North America, Agaricus praeclaresquamosus A.E. Freeman 1979, has several variants, some of which are larger.

The rare Agaricus phaeolepidotus also has the iodoform, or ink smell, but has browner cap scales, and stains yellow less readily.

Distribution and habitat
Agaricus moelleri is found in the temperate zones of the northern hemisphere. North America, Asia Britain, and Europe, growing in mixed forests and woods. It is widespread, but can be locally rare, and favors rich alkaline woodland, or parkland.

Toxicity
In the same fashion as the yellow stainer (Agaricus xanthodermus), Agaricus moelleri can produce gastrointestinal symptoms for some people but not others, when ingested. It is considered toxic.

Similar species
Agaricus hondensis is similar, with a pinkish tint and firmer flesh.

See also
List of Agaricus species

References

External links
English Country Garden

moelleri
Fungi of Europe
Fungi of North America
Fungi described in 1976